Sidi Salah can refer to the following places in Tunisia:

Oued Sidi Salah, a wadi of eastern Tunisia
Henchir-Sidi-Salah, a rural locality and archaeological site
Sidi Salah Bou Kabrine Mosque
Sidi Salah Zlaoui Mausoleum, a mausoleum in Béja
Sidi-Salah cemetery, a cemetery in Le Bardo
Sidi Salah, a small village  from Sidi Bouzid in the Sidi Bouzid Governorate
Sidi Salah, a quarter of La Soukra, itself a northern suburb of Tunis.